Macit Koper (born 1 March 1944) is a Turkish actor and scriptwriter.

He has worked as actor and director at Şehir Theatres and Dostlar Theatres. His cinematic breakthrough came with his role as Zebercet in the movie Anayurt Oteli.

Life and career 
He was born in Istanbul in 1944. He became interested in theatre after joining the Beşiktaş Community Center during his high school years. He was the student of actors such as Muhsin Ertuğrul, Beklan Algan and Ayla Algan at the LCC Theatre School.

He worked as an actor, dramatist and director at Dostlar Theatre between 1969 and 1979. He continued to work in this institution until the Dostlar Theater was closed for economic reasons in 1979. He joined the Istanbul City Theatres during the 1979/1980 season. He later went to Berlin to prepare a play about foreign workers. He also wrote and directed the play Giden, Tez Geri Dönmez. His career in theatre ended in 1980 after the 1980 Turkish coup d'état. He continued to work as an actor, director and writer at Dostlar Theatre. In the 1981–1982 season, he adapted Yaşar Kemal's novel Ağrı Dağı Efsanesi to a play.

Koper has worked as an actor and screenwriter in cinema and on stage. He started scriptwriting in 1983 with the movie Seni Seviyorum with the encouragement of Atıf Yılmaz. After writing the script for Rumuz Goncagül in 1987, he worked mainly with directors İrfan Tözüm and Ömer Kavur. As an actor, he starred in films such as Aaahh Belinda and Melodram. He received great acclaim for his success in the role of Zebercet in Anayurt Oteli. In 1989, he returned to his duty in City Theatres by court decision. He won many national and international awards in the fields of theatre and cinema both for acting and scriptwriting as well as directing. In 2013, he portrayed Lala Mustafa Pasha in the historical drama series Muhteşem Yüzyıl. In 2016, he was cast in Poyraz Karayel.

Personal 
He is married to Hülya Koper, who is also a scriptwriter and artist. Actor Gün Koper is his son.

Theatre

As director 
 Kırmızı Pazartesi : Gabriel García Márquez - Istanbul City Theatres - 2008
 Titanik Orkestrası : Hristo Boychev - Istanbul City Theatres - 2006
 Antigone : Sophocles - Istanbul City Theatres - 2005
 Kuş Operasyonu : Hristo Boychev - Istanbul City Theatres - 2002
 Deli Eder İnsanı Bu Dünya : Erkan Akın - 1998
 Oyunlarla Yaşayanlar : Oğuz Atay - Istanbul City Theatres - 1998
 Aslolan Hayattır : Nâzım Hikmet \ Macit Koper - Istanbul City Theatres - 1994
 Kadınlar Da Savaşı Yitirdi : Curzio Malaparte - 1992
 Bir Anarşistin Kaza Sonucu Ölümü : Dario Fo - Yeditepe Oyuncuları  - 1991
 Meraklısı İçin Öylesine Bir Hikâye : Sait Faik Abasıyanık - Istanbul City Theatres - 1988
 İkili Oyun : Bilgesu Erenus - Dostlar Theatre - 1978
 Ortak : Bilgesu Erenus - Dostlar Theatre - 1976

As actor 
 Cumhuriyet Kızı : Memet Baydur - Istanbul City Theatres
 Bitmeyen Kavga : John Steinbeck - Dostlar Theatre
 Ezenler Ezilenler Başkaldıranlar : Mehmet Akan - Dostlar Theatre
 Düşmanlar : Maxim Gorky - Dostlar Theatre
 Alpagut Olayı : Haşmet Zeybek - Dostlar Theatre
 Azizname : Aziz Nesin \ Genco Erkal - Dostlar Theatre
 Abdülcambaz : Turhan Selçuk - Dostlar Theatre
 Soruşturma : Peter Weiss - Dostlar Theatre
 Havana Duruşması : Hans Magnus Enzensberger - Dostlar Theatre
 Asiye Nasıl Kurtulur : Vasıf Öngören - Dostlar Theatre - 1985
 Galileo Galilei : Bertolt Brecht - Dostlar Theatre - 1983

Filmography

As actor

Film 

 İftarlık Gazoz - 2016
 İçimdeki İnsan - 2014
 Küçük Günahlar - 2010
 Melekler Evi - 2000 
 Akrebin Yolculuğu - 1997  
 Aşk Üzerine Söylenmemiş Her Şey - 1995 
 Cazibe Hanımın Gündüz Düşleri - 1992 
 Menekşe Koyu - 1991 
 Melodram - 1988 
 Ada - 1988 
 Rumuz Goncagül - 1987 
 Gece Yolculuğu - 1987 
 Dolunay  - 1987 
 Afife Jale - 1987 
 Değirmen - 1986
 Anayurt Oteli  - 1986 
 Bekçi  - 1986 
 Aaahh Belinda - 1986 
 Hodja fra Pjort - 1985 
 Adı Vasfiye - 1985 
 Bir Yudum Sevgi - 1984 
 Şekerpare - 1984 
 Hakkâri'de Bir Mevsim - 1983 
 At - 1981 
 Düşman - 1979 
 Köşeyi Dönen Adam - 1978

TV series 
 Baba - 2022
 Elkızı - 2021
 Kağıt Ev - 2021
 Ramo - 2020
 Yüzleşme - 2019
 Masal Çiçeği - 2019
 Avlu - 2018
 Siyah Beyaz Aşk - 2018
 Hayat Sevince Güzel - 2016
 Poyraz Karayel - 2016
 Üç Arkadaş - 2014
 Muhteşem Yüzyıl - 2013
 Ağır Roman Yeni Dünya - 2012
 Al Yazmalım - 2011
 Havada Bulut - 2002 
 Kurtuluş - 1994

As scriptwriter 

 Yaralı Yürek - 2007 
 Hasret - 2006 
 Patroniçe - 2004 
 Beş Kollu Avize - 2004 
 Beybaba / Koltuk - 2003 
 Şıh Senem - 2003 
 Karşılaşma - 2002 
 Canlı Hayat - 2000 
 Baba - 1999 
 Her şey Oğlum İçin - 1998 
 Anlaşma Noktası - 1997 
 Baba Evi - 1997 
 Akrebin Yolculuğu - 1997 
 Sen de Gitme Triandafilis - 1995 
  Kız Kulesi Aşıkları / Hera ile Leandros - 1993 
 Cazibe Hanımın Gündüz Düşleri - 1992 
 Zıkkımın Kökü - 1992 
 Deniz Gurbetçileri - 1991 
 Kiraz Çiçek Açıyor - 1990 
 Fotoğraflar - 1989 
 İsa, Musa, Meryem - 1989 
 Sevgiler Düşlerde Kaldı - 1989 
 Kadın Dul Kalınca - 1988 
 Bu Devrin Kadını - 1988 
 Melodram - 1988 
 Yedi Uyuyanlar - 1988 
 Ada - 1988 
 Çil Horoz - 1987 
 Rumuz Goncagül - 1987 
 Fikrimin İnce Gülü - Sarı Mercedes - 1987 
 Zincir - 1987 
 Bez Bebek - 1987 
 Uzun Bir Gece - 1986 
 Arzu - 1985 
 Acı - 1984 
 Fidan - 1984 
 Seni Seviyorum - 1983

Awards

References

External links 
 

1944 births
Turkish male film actors
Turkish male television actors
Turkish male stage actors
Turkish male screenwriters
Living people
Male actors from Istanbul
20th-century Turkish male actors
21st-century Turkish male actors